Mette Janson (1 May 1934 – 24 November 2004) was a Norwegian journalist. She was born in Bergen, the daughter of the sculptor Gunnar Janson and the sister of the composer Alfred Janson, niece of Henry Gleditsch. She married the theatre director Magne Bleness. She was the first female news presenter of Dagsrevyen, and worked for the Norwegian Broadcasting Corporation for more than forty years.

References

1934 births
2004 deaths
Journalists from Bergen
Norwegian television news anchors
NRK people
Alumni of RADA